Nyali is a constituency in Kenya. It is one of six constituencies in Mombasa County. It was carved out of Kisauni Constituency after the promulgation of the New Constitution of Kenya, 2010. It was established for the 2013 General Elections. The current MP is the former journalist Mohammed Ali alias Jicho Pevu who won the elections on an Independent Ticket.

Members of Parliament

References 

Constituencies in Mombasa County